Litoporus manu is a cellar spider species found in Peru.

Taxonomic references 

 Litoporus manu Huber, 2000: 305, f. 1226-1230 (Dm).

See also 
 List of Pholcidae species

References 

 Huber, B. A. (2000). New World pholcid spiders (Araneae: Pholcidae): A revision at generic level. Bulletin of the American Museum of Natural History 254.

Invertebrates of Peru
Pholcidae
Spiders of South America
Spiders described in 2000